Talostolida teres, common name the tapering cowry, is a species of sea snail, a cowry, a marine gastropod mollusk in the family Cypraeidae, the cowries.

Subspecies
Recognized subspecies within this species are:
Talostolida teres alveolus (Tapparone-Canefri, 1882) (synonyms: Blasicrura teres alveolus (Tapparone-Canefri, 1882); Cribraria teres alveolus Tapparone-Canefri, 1882; Cypraea teres alveolus Tapperone-Canefri) (taxon inquirendum)
Talostolida teres elatensis (Heiman & Mienis, 2002) (synonym: Blasicrura teres elatensis Heiman & Mienis, 2002)
Talostolida teres janae (Lorenz, 2002) (synonym: * Blasicrura teres janae Lorenz, 2002)
Talostolida teres teres (Gmelin, 1791) (synonyms: Blasicrura teres teres (Gmelin, 1791); Cypraea teres teres Gmelin, 1791)
Synonyms
Talostolida teres natalensis (Heiman & Mienis, 2002): synonym of Talostolida pellucens pellucens (Melvill, 1888)  (synonym: Blasicrura teres natalensis Heiman & Mienis, 2002)

Description
They are very variable in pattern and colour. The shape may be cylindrical or sub-cylindrical. The dorsum surface is smooth and shiny, the basic color is whitish, greenish or pale brown, with irregular dark brown patches, sometimes forming two-three transversal bands. The surface may also be completely grey-greenish. The margins are white or pale brown, with some dark dots and a pronounced labial 'callus'. The base is white or pinkish with fine short teeth. In the living cowries mantle is orange-reddish, with white sensorial papillae. Mantle and foot are well developed, with external antennae.

Distribution
This species and the subspecies occur widely in the Red Sea, in the Indian Ocean off East Africa and South Africa (Aldabra, Chagos, the Comores, Kenya, Madagascar, the Mascarene Basin, Mauritius, Mozambique, Réunion, the Seychelles, Somalia and Tanzania) and in Western and Eastern Pacific Ocean  along Western Australia, Philippines and Hawaii. The subspecies Blasicrura teres pellucens (Melvill, 1888) reach Galapagos and Panama.

Habitat
These cowries live on rocks or under corals in the intertidal zone.

References

 Verdcourt, B. (1954). The cowries of the East African Coast (Kenya, Tanganyika, Zanzibar and Pemba). Journal of the East Africa Natural History Society 22(4) 96: 129-144, 17 pls.
 Burgess, C.M. (1970). The Living Cowries. AS Barnes and Co, Ltd. Cranbury, New Jersey
 E.L.Heiman – The Ters Complex - The Teres Complex
 Lorenz, F. (2017). Cowries. A guide to the gastropod family Cypraeidae. Volume 1, Biology and systematics. Harxheim: ConchBooks. 644 pp. page(s): 491

External links
 Gmelin J.F. (1791). Vermes. In: Gmelin J.F. (Ed.) Caroli a Linnaei Systema Naturae per Regna Tria Naturae, Ed. 13. Tome 1(6). G.E. Beer, Lipsiae [Leipzig. pp. 3021-3910]
 Link, D.H.F. (1807-1808). Beschreibung der Naturalien-Sammlung der Universität zu Rostock. Adlers Erben. 1 Abt. 
 Biolib
 Park
 Darwin Foundation
 Clade

Cypraeidae
Articles containing video clips
Gastropods described in 1791
Taxa named by Johann Friedrich Gmelin